Kotawaringin, or Kota Waringin was a sultanate on the south coast of Borneo.  It covered an area in what is now the Indonesian province of Central Kalimantan. Its final form was a brief existence as an autonomous "native state" in the United States of Indonesia between 1949 and 1950.

See also 

 East Kotawaringin Regency
 West Kotawaringin Regency

References

 

Central Kalimantan